Zestoa is a town located in the province of Gipuzkoa, in the autonomous community of the Basque Country, northern Spain.

References

External links
 Official Website 
 ZESTOA in the Bernardo Estornés Lasa - Auñamendi Encyclopedia (Euskomedia Fundazioa) 

Municipalities in Gipuzkoa